Kimmo Juhani Tarkkio (born 15 January 1966) is a retired Finnish footballer who played as a striker. After retiring, he took up billiards.

International career
Tarkkio made his debut with the Finnish national team on the 21 February 1986, in a 0–0 friendly draw with Bahrain. On 13 January 1989, Tarkkio scored his first goal for Finland in their 2–1 friendly loss to Egypt at the Cairo International Stadium in Cairo.

Tarkkio played his last game for the Huuhkajat on  14 November 1992, against France in a 1994 FIFA World Cup qualifier. Tarkkio finished his international career with 33 caps and scoring 3 goals.

International goals

References

External links
 

1966 births
Living people
Footballers from Helsinki
Finnish footballers
Association football forwards
Finland youth international footballers
Finland under-21 international footballers
Finland international footballers
Finnish expatriate footballers
Finnish expatriate sportspeople in Sweden
Expatriate footballers in Sweden
Expatriate footballers in Singapore
Expatriate footballers in Portugal
Expatriate footballers in China
Veikkausliiga players
Allsvenskan players
Singapore Premier League players
Primeira Liga players
Liga Portugal 2 players
JJK Jyväskylä players
Helsingin Jalkapalloklubi players
Hammarby Fotboll players
Tanjong Pagar United FC players
FC Haka players
FC Lahti players
FC Kuusysi players
G.D. Chaves players
F.C. Felgueiras players
FinnPa players
PK-35 Vantaa (men) players
Geylang International FC players
Vaasan Palloseura players
Mikkelin Palloilijat players
Guangzhou F.C. players